Lake, Michigan may refer to any of several places in the U.S. state of Michigan:

Lake, Clare County, Michigan, an unincorporated community in Garfield Township
Lake Township, Michigan (disambiguation), eight places
Lake County, Michigan
Lake City, Michigan

See also
Lake Michigan, a Great Lake
List of lakes in Michigan